Aurahi (Harushaha) is a Village Development Committee in Dhanusa District in Madhesh Province of south-eastern Nepal. At the time of the 2018 Nepal census it had a population of 9,765 and had 1460 houses.

References

Populated places in Dhanusha District
Rural municipalities of Nepal established in 2017
Rural municipalities in Madhesh Province